(born 10 September 1962) is a retired Japanese triple jumper. He was the first Japanese to jump over 17 metres in the event. His personal best jump was 17.15 metres, achieved in June 1986 in Tokyo.

His children are also track and field athletes. His oldest son Kohei Yamashita is also triple jumper and competed at the 2016 Olympic Games. His second son Jun Yamashita is a sprinter and competed at the 2019 World Championships. His daughter Toko Yamashita is also triple jumper and finished seventh at the 2020 Japanese Championships.

Personal bests

Achievements

National titles
Japanese Championships
Triple jump: 1985, 1986, 1987, 1988, 1992, 1995, 1996

References

External links

1962 births
Living people
Sportspeople from Mie Prefecture
Japanese male triple jumpers
Olympic male triple jumpers
Olympic athletes of Japan
Athletes (track and field) at the 1988 Summer Olympics
Athletes (track and field) at the 1992 Summer Olympics
Asian Games gold medalists for Japan
Asian Games gold medalists in athletics (track and field)
Athletes (track and field) at the 1986 Asian Games
Medalists at the 1986 Asian Games
Competitors at the 1986 Goodwill Games
World Athletics Championships athletes for Japan
Japan Championships in Athletics winners
University of Tsukuba alumni